Mt. Olympus Water and Theme Park Resort is a theme park and water park resort complex in Wisconsin Dells, Wisconsin. The resort is themed after Ancient Greece, particularly its mythology and gods, and is named after the mountain in Greece where those gods were said to live. Mt. Olympus features an indoor and outdoor water park and amusement park rides, and the complex includes dozens of motel buildings that were acquired by the resort in addition to its purpose-built hotel.

History

Beginnings
Mt. Olympus was started by the Laskaris family. Demetrios “Jim” Laskaris was born in Katsaros, Greece and immigrated to the United States at the age of 13. He received a technical degree in Michigan, served for four years in the U.S. Navy, and then owned and operated several restaurants in Chicago. The family moved to Wisconsin Dells, where Jim and his wife Fotoula opened a hot dog stand in 1970, which they named “Big Chief”, after a statue purchased from a trade show. The hot dog stand was a commercial failure, and the Laskaris family was nearly forced to return to Chicago. At the last minute, they found $700 in savings inside a sock, which they invested in a three-wheeler dirt track.

The family expanded on their property by building a 7-unit motel, and in 1975 they added a go-kart track, "Goofy Karts", along the Wisconsin Dells Parkway. Nick Laskaris, Jim and Fotoula's son, became the go-karts' chief mechanic at the age of 9. Between 1978 & 1982, the family's business ventures continued as they opened a campground, trailer court, and began running country-western and Native American ceremony shows. When the lease on the go-kart track ran out in 1980, “Goofy Karts” was abandoned and a new cloverleaf track was built next to the Big Chief hot dog stand. It was also at this location that Nick Laskaris started constructing his own go-karts a few years later.

Nick Laskaris became involved in the design and engineering of the various go-kart tracks on the property, which included the only multi-level go-kart tracks in the world. Big Chief Go-Kart World, as it was then known, developed new techniques for elevated go-kart tracks, which have now become standard. The family purchased several acres along the Wisconsin Dells Parkway, commonly known as the "Strip", and continued the park's expansion. In 1995, the park added the first roller coaster in the Wisconsin Dells, Cyclops, and changed its name to Big Chief Karts & Coasters. Another roller coaster, Pegasus, was added the following year and Zeus opened in 1997. The park acquired Crazy King Ludwig's Adventure Park, which featured its own go-kart track, in 1999. This purchase brought Big Chief's to a total area of 107 acres.

Mt. Olympus Water and Theme Park
Big Chief Karts and Coasters was renamed to Big Chief's Mt. Olympus Theme Park in 2004 and the park expanded its Greco-Roman theming. Later that year, Mt. Olympus entered into a partnership with the Mattei family, owners of the nearby Treasure Island Resort. This partnership merged Treasure Island's outdoor Family Land Waterpark and the Bay of Dreams indoor water park with the Mt. Olympus theme park, creating a co-owned complex known as the Mt. Olympus Water and Theme Park. These two parks were not physically connected at the time of the merger because the Playday Motel separated them, leading Mt. Olympus to purchase the Playday Motel and demolish it.

The park opened their largest roller coaster, Hades, for the 2005 season. Hades is a wooden roller coaster which became notable for its unusually steep drops and angles, and received the inaugural Golden Ticket Award for Best New Ride from Amusement Today magazine. In 2006, Mt. Olympus introduced the Parthenon Indoor Theme Park, a 43,000 sq ft building containing several amusement rides, including a spinning wild Mouse roller coaster called Opa. dus acquired Treasure Island entirely from the Mattei family. The purchase also included Pleasant View Motel, which became "Mykonos Village", and the Captain's Quarters, a family-oriented hotel building which was sold to Bluegreen Resorts and now operates as "Bluegreen Odyssey Dells", attached to the Hotel Rome (formerly the Treasure Island Resort).

The Lost City of Atlantis, a three-acre outdoor water park area, opened in 2012. Atlantis features seven new slides from WhiteWater West, a monster dump bucket and a 120' geyser, built at a cost of $3.5 million.

Hades received a major renovation in 2013, adding a 360-degree inversion and the coaster was renamed Hades 360. "The Manticore", a vertical swing ride, was added to the park in 2015. "The Great Pool of Delphi", a 27,000 square foot swimming pool containing 500,000 gallons of water, was added in 2016. The pool was advertised as the largest swimming pool in Wisconsin Dells, the "waterpark capital of the world". The cost of this addition was $4 million.

In 2019, Mount Olympus representatives announced at the IAAPA Expo their purchase of a new Slidewheel waterslide for the 2021 season. Named Hercules, the slide would consist of a perpetually rotating wheel in which rafts would be dispatched into every 30 seconds, and move through the knot of slide tunnels akin to a massive hamster wheel. However, the impact of the COVID-19 pandemic in 2020 halted plans to install the slide in time for the 2021 season. The renamed Medusa's Slidewheel was formally announced on August 6, 2021, and is currently on track to open within the Indoor Waterpark area for the 2022 season. The slidewheel will be accompanied by a brand-new indoor waterpark expansion, with a general pool named Serpent's Pool.

Acquisitions of other properties
In 2010 and 2011, the park purchased several smaller nearby independent motels and hotels and renamed them, creating seven new lodging areas and painting the buildings blue and white to fit the Greek theme. These acquisitions included the Star Motel and Luna Inn & Suites (which became Poseidon's Village), the Riverwalk Hotel (which became Santorini Village), American World Resort & Campground (which became Zeus's Village), and the Four Seasons Motel (which became Poseidon's Village). Mt. Olympus also purchased the Raintree Resort and Conference Center, the first hotel built by Todd Nelson, who currently owns the Kalahari Resort.

The Copa Cabana Resort Hotel & Suite was completely renovated after it was purchased by Mt. Olympus in 2011, and it reopened as the core of "Mt. Olympus Village" the following spring. All of the resort's acquired motels were rebranded once again to Mt. Olympus Village in 2013. This change coincided with the purchases of the Concord Inn and the Monaco Motel. The addition of these properties gave the resort a total of over 1,300 rooms. Recent acquisitions include the Diamond Hotel in 2015 and the Ambers Resort and Conference Center in 2016.

Incidents
On March 6, 2014, a lap bar malfunction caused by inadequate maintenance occurred on the Opa roller coaster in the indoor theme park, causing a 63-year-old man from Fremont, Wisconsin, to fall 17 feet from the ride, sustaining serious injuries that left him in a coma for three weeks. The ride was permanently closed following the incident and later removed.

On January 23, 2015, a 4-year-old nearly drowned in the indoor water park. EMS responded and took the child to St. Clair Hospital. Three months after the incident, the Dells-Delton EMS team presented Mt. Olympus and the lifeguards involved in rescuing the child with certificates for life-saving efforts.

In July 2015, an elastic cable snapped on "The Catapult" reverse bungee ride located in the outdoor theme park. A video of the incident was uploaded to Facebook and was widely shared before ultimately being removed. The ride was owned and operated by Casco, Inc., and was an up-charge attraction that was not included with the price of admission to the park. Mt. Olympus removed the ride from the park two days later.

Timeline
1995: Addition of Cyclops wooden roller coaster
1996: Addition of Pegasus wooden roller coaster
1997: Additions of Zeus wooden roller coaster The Trojan Horse go-kart track
2000: Addition of Kiddie Land
2004: Addition of Dive to Atlantis water roller coaster.
2005: Additions of Hades wooden roller coaster and Triton's Water slide Tower
2006: Additions of The Parthenon Indoor Theme Park and Thunder and Lightning Speed Slides
2007: Additions of Poseidon's Rage Surf Pool, Apollo's Swing, Medusa's Indoor Waterpark, "Neptune's outdoor water park, Hotel Rome" and Mykonos Village. Dive to Atlantis removed.
2008: Addition of The River Troy
2009: Additions of The Almighty Hermes Sky coaster and Night at the Theme Park
2010: Additions of Catapult Extreme Ride and Poseidon's Beach
2011: Additions of Poseidon's Village, Zeus's Village, Mykonos Resort and Santorini Village
2012: Additions of Lost City of Atlantis water play structure and Mt. Olympus Village
2013: Hades renovated & renamed Hades 360, additions of Concord Inn, Monaco Motel and Pine Dell Motel
2014: Opa removed
2015: Additions of The Manticore vertical swing ride, Diamond Hotel and Bridge View Motel. Catapult removed.
2016: Additions of The Great Pool of Delphi a 27,000-square-foot, 500,000-gallon swimming pool and water attraction, and "Ambers Resort and Conference Center"2018: "Poseidon Underwater Go-Kart Track" is rethemed and renamed to "Underworld Go-Kart Track"
2022: America's first SlideWheel attraction will open in the Indoor Waterpark

Outdoor theme park
The outdoor theme park section at Mt. Olympus consists of go-karts, roller coasters and a few other rides.

Roller coasters

 Cyclops - A wooden roller coaster featuring a  drop.
Inside the tunnel is a turn banked to a 90° angle. For 2013, the park added a 360 degree inverted roll on the second hill, a 110 degree overbanked turn, and added new Timberliner trains from The Gravity Group.
 Little Titans - A small E&F Miler junior roller coaster
 Pegasus - A wooden roller coaster built over Medusa's Drop.
It passes through a forest, climbs a  hill, then drops at  down an  drop.

Go-kart tracks

 Helios Track - This multi-level track dips up and around and back down again.
 Hermes' Turbo Track - The fastest track at the park.
 Orion Intermediate Go-Kart Track - An intermediate track intended for children
 Tiny Hero Go-Kart Track - Beginner track for young children
 Titan's Tower
 Trojan Horse - This track used to consist of a multi-level, three-story track that went through a large Trojan horse. (that part of the track is now closed off) This track winds down  and around tight turns and back to the top again.
 Underworld Go-Kart Track - This track goes up and down towers, and of course, underwater. Was branded Poseidon Underwater Go-Kart Track prior to 2018.

Other rides
 Apollo's Swing - A  S&S Sansei Screamin' Swing that seats four passengers and reaches speeds of 
 Batting Cages - 25 cent coin-operated machines
 Kiddie Swing – A rotating circle of arms holding a swing in each, designed for children.
 Kiddie Train - A children's train
 Pan's Animal Farm - Get up close and hand-feed a variety of animals
 Rock Wall – A 30-foot climbing wall
 The Almighty Hermes - A Skycoaster attraction that reaches heights of 100 feet and speeds of up to 45 miles per hour.
 The Manticore - A 140-foot tall tower with a rotating center with 12 connected arms and 12 double-seat chairs, which can accommodate 24 guests, spinning them high in the air.

Former rides
 Catapult – A reverse bungee ride removed in July 2015 due to a cable snapping before two riders were launched into the air.
 Dive to Atlantis - Opened in 2004 and 2007; E&F Miler water coaster

Outdoor water park
Water slides

 Triton's Fury -  family raft ride
 Triton's Rage –  family raft ride
 Triton's Challenge – Side-by-side,  six-lane downhill mat racer

Other rides

 The Great Pool of Delphi a 27,000-square-foot, 500,000-gallon swimming pool
 The River Troy – A faster lazy river connected to a shallow pool
 Tidal Wave - The original wave pool at the park

Former rides

 Blue Magnum Mat Slides -  Mat slides (formerly four body slides named individually, "Wipeout", "The Kamikaze", "Corkscrew" and "Twister")
 Comet - Children's slide
 Deuces Wild - Tube slide
 Double Barrel - Enclosed tube slide
 Double Trouble – Tube slide
 Lightning - Enclosed speed slide
 Little Dipper - Children's slide
 Thunder - Speed slide
 Bumper Boats
 Demon's Drop – A body slide featuring an  drop
 Huck's Lagoon – An interactive children's water play area featuring tunnels, six waterslides, cannons and multi-level hands-on water activities. It was demolished to make way for the upcoming Slidewheel attraction.

Indoor theme park 

Current rides
 Balloon Ride
 Bumper Cars
 Crazy Trolley
 Rock Wall Climb
 Spring Ride
 Tea Cups
 The Arcade

Former rides
 Go-Karts
 Disk'o
 Free Fall
 Opa

Indoor water park

Medusa's Indoor Waterpark is a  indoor water park at Mt. Olympus. It was originally part of the Treasure Island Resort and was available exclusively to Treasure Island guests before the merger with Mt. Olympus. When originally acquired it was called Bay of Dreams until the area was remodeled and expanded in 2021/2022.

Water slides
 Cerberus Tube Slide – Tube slide that is over 10 stories high
 Hydra Body Slide - Basic body slide
  Medusa's Slidewheel - A WhiteWater West SlideWheel attraction, opened in 2022 as the first of its kind in North America.

Other attractions
 The Fire Pool — hot tub
 River Styx – lazy river
 Scylla's Pool — whirlpool
 Divine Warming Pool - simple pool area with soothing waters and calming sounds
 Serpent's Pool — kid-friendly water play area

Former rides
 Cobra - Enclosed body slide, removed for the Slidewheel
 Diamondback - Body slide, removed for the Slidewheel

Night at the Theme Park
In the summer of 2009, Mt. Olympus began Night at the Theme Park'', where select rides (Hades 360, Poseidon's Rage, Zeus, Trojan Horse Go-Kart Track, Underworld Go-Kart Track and the Kiddie Land Rides) would be open from 10 pm to 1 am for four nights weekly. People who would attend would receive free soda and parking. Nick Laskaris got the idea when he took his children to go see Night at the Museum: Battle of the Smithsonian at the local cinema. The village of Lake Delton did not approve the event, because it was in violation of its amusement ordinance in which businesses have to close around midnight and their 11 pm curfew law. Village trustees were worried about someone crossing the busy Wisconsin Dells Parkway at night and getting hit by a car.  The village of Lake Delton subsequently made some changes to the amusement ordinance, with a variance for businesses if they requested, including Mt. Olympus. The village board had these changes on hold.

References

External links

Amusement parks in Wisconsin
Wisconsin Dells, Wisconsin
Water parks in Wisconsin
2004 establishments in Wisconsin
Amusement parks opened in 2004